Ndalu de Almeida (born July 5,1977) is a writer born in Angola who uses the pen name Ondjaki. He has written poetry, children's books, short stories, novels, drama and film scripts.

Career
Ondjaki studied sociology at the University of Lisbon, and wrote his thesis on Angolan writer Luandino Vieira. In 2010, he received his Doctorate in African Studies in Italy. Ondjaki's literary debut came in 2000 with the poetry book Actu Sanguíneu, which was followed up with the childhood memoir Bom dia camaradas ("Good Morning, Comrades") in 2001. To date (2018) his body of work includes five novels, four collections of short stories, six collections of poetry and six children's books. He has also made a documentary film, May Cherries Grow, about his native city. His books have been translated to French, Spanish, Italian, German, Serbian, English, Polish and Swedish. Granma Nineteen and the Soviet's Secrets is his most recent book in English (Spring 2014, from Biblioasis).

In 2008 Ondjaki was awarded the Grinzane for Africa Prize in the category of Best Young Writer. In 2012, he was named by Zukiswa Wanner in The Guardian as one of the "top five African writers" (alongside Léonora Miano, H. J. Golakai, Chika Unigwe and Thando Mgqolozana). He is one of 39 writers aged under 40 from sub-Saharan Africa who in April 2014 were chosen as part of the Hay Festival's prestigious Africa39 project.

In October 2010 he won the Brazilian award Premio Jabuti de Literatura, in the juvenile category, with the book AvóDezanove e o Segredo do Soviético. In 2013 he was awarded the José Saramago Prize for his novel  Os Transparentes.

Awards and recognition
2008: Grinzane for young writer Prize - Ethiopia
2010: literatura em lingua portuguesa Prize - by FNLIJ, Brazil, for AvóDezanove e o segredo do soviético (available in English, in Canada)
2010: São Paulo Prize for Literature — shortlisted in the Best Book of the Year category for Avó Dezanove e o Segredo do Soviético
2010: Jabuti Prize - Brazil, for AvóDezanove e o segredo do soviético
2011: Caxinde do conto infantil Prize - Angola, for Ombela, a estória das chuvas
2012: Bissaya Barreto Prize - Portugal, for A bicicleta que tinha bigodes
2013: literatura em lingua portuguesa Prize - by FNLIJ, Brazil, for A bicicleta que tinha bigodes
2013: José Saramago Prize - with Os Transparentes
2014: Selected as part of the Hay Festival's Africa39 project featuring 39 writers from sub-Saharan Africa aged under 40.
2014: literatura em lingua portuguesa Prize - by FNLIJ, Brazil, for Uma escuridão bonita
2014: Jabuti Prize (juvenile category, 3rd place) - Brazil, for Uma escuridão bonita

Works in translation 

 Italy
 “Il Fischiatore” - [O Assobiador] Publisher: Lavoro, 2005; Translation: Vincenzo Barca
 “Le aurore della notte” - [Quantas madrugadas tem a noite] Publisher: Lavoro, 2006; Translation: Vincenzo Barca
 “Buongiorno compagni!” - [Bom dia Camaradas] Publisher: Iacobelli, 2011; Translation: Livia Apa
 “NonnaDiciannove e il segreto del sovietico” - [Avó Dezanove e o segredo do soviético] Publisher: Il Sirente, 2015; Translation: Livia Apa
 Uruguay
 “Buenos días camaradas” - [Bom dia Camaradas] Publisher: Banda Oriental, 2005; Translation: Ana García Iglesias
 Switzerland
 “Bonjour Camarades” - [Bom dia Camaradas] Publisher: La Joie de Lire (French rights), 2005; Translation: Dominique Nédellec
 “Bom Dia Camaradas: Ein Roman aus Angola” Publisher: NordSüd 2006; Translation: Claudia Stein
 “Ceux de ma rue” - [Os da minha rua] Publisher: La Joie de Lire, 2007; Translation: Dominique Nédellec
 Spain
 “Y si mañana el miedo” - [E se amanhã o medo] Publisher: Xordica, 2007; Translation: Félix Romeo
 “Buenos dias camaradas” - [Bom dia Camaradas] Publisher: Txalaparta, 2010; Translation: Ana García Iglesias
 United Kingdom
 “The Whistler” - [O Assobiador] Publisher: Aflame Books, 2008; Translation: Richard Bartlett
 Canada
 “Good Morning Comrades” - [Bom dia Camaradas] Publisher: Biblioasis (rights for Canada/USA), 2008; Translation: Stephen Henighan
 “Granma Nineteen and the Soviet’s Secret” - [Avó Dezanove e o segredo do soviético] Publisher: Biblioasis (rights for Canada/USA), 2014; Translation: Stephen Henighan
 Transparent City - [Os transparentes] Publisher: Biblioasis (rights for Canada/USA), 2018; Translation: Stephen Henighan
 Mexico
 “Buenos dias camaradas” - [Bom dia Camaradas] Publisher: Almadía, 2008; Translation: Ana García Iglesias
 Los transparentes - [Os transparentes] Publisher: 2014; Translation: Ana García Iglesias
 Argentina
 “El Silbador” - [O Assobiador] Publisher: Letranómada, 2011; Translation: Florencia Garramuño
 Los transparentes - [Os transparentes] Publisher: Letranómada, 2014
 Serbia
 “Dobar dan, drugovi” - [Bom dia Camaradas] Publisher: Krativni centar, 2009; Translation: Ana Kuzmanović-Jovanović
 Sweden
 [O Assobiador] Publisher: Tranan, 2009; Translation: Yvonne Blank
 [Bom dia camaradas] Publisher: Tranan, 2010; Translation: Yvonne Blank
 [Ynari: a menina das cinco tranças] Publisher: Tranan, 2010; Translation: Yvonne Blank
 Cuba
 “Buenos dias, compañeros” - [Bom dia Camaradas] Publisher: Editorial Gente Nueva, 2010; Translation: Ana Garcia Iglesias
 Poland
 [Avó Dezanove e o segredo do soviético] Publisher: Karakter 2012
 France
 Les Transparent - [Os transparentes] Publisher: Métailié, 2015; Translation: Danielle Schramm
 Germany
 Die Durchsichtigen - [Os transparentes] Publisher: Wunderhorn, 2015; Translation: Michael Kegler

Bibliography 
Actu Sanguíneu (poetry, 2000)
Bom Dia Camaradas (novel, 2001) - available in Cuba, Uruguay, Mexico, Spain, Switzerland, France, Canada, USA, Serbia, Italy, Sweden (translations)
Momentos de Aqui (short stories, 2001)
O Assobiador (novella, 2002) - available in English translation; Sweden, Italy, Argentina (translations)
Há Prendisajens com o Xão (poetry, 2002)
Ynari: A Menina das Cinco Tranças (children's, 2004) - available in Sweden
Quantas Madrugadas Tem A Noite (novel, 2004) - available in Italy
E se Amanhã o Medo (short stories, 2005) - available in Spain (translation)
Os da minha rua (short stories, 2007) - available in Switzerland and France (translation)
Avó Dezanove e o segredo do soviético (novel, 2008) - available in English translation, Canada & US; also in Italy, Poland (translations)
O leão e o coelho saltitão (children's, 2008)
Materiais para confecção de um espanador de tristezas (poetry, 2009)
O voo do Golfinho (children's, 2009)
Dentro de mim faz Sul, seguido de Acto sanguíneo (poetry, 2010)
A bicicleta que tinha bigodes (young adult, 2011)
Os transparentes (novel, 2012) - translations available in Mexico, Argentina, France, Germany (soon)
Uma escuridão bonita (young adult, 2013)
Sonhos azuis pelas esquinas (short stories, Portugal/Caminho, 2014)
Os vivos, o morto e o peixe frito (theatre, 2014)
O céu não sabe dançar sozinho (short stories, Brazil/Lingua Geral, 2014)
O Carnaval da Kissonde (children's, Portugal, 2015)
Os modos do mármore (poetry, Galiza, 2015)
Verbetes para um dicionário afetivo (co-author; Portugal, 2015)
O convidador de pirilampos (children's, Portugal, 2017)
Há gente em casa (poetry, Portugal, 2018)
a estória do Sol e do Rinoceronte (children´s, Portugal, 2020)
o livro do Deslembramento (novel, Angola, 2020)

References 

Anita Theorell, Afrika har ordet (2010), Nordiska Afrikainstitutet, .

External links 

Ondjaki's website
Ondjaki recorded for the literary archive in the Hispanic Division at the Library of Congress on March 15, 2015. 

1977 births
Living people
Angolan writers
University of Lisbon alumni
Writers from Luanda
21st-century male writers